The Alexander Boyter House at 590 N. 200 West, Beaver, Utah was built in 1882 by Alexander Boyter and was his home.  It was expanded twice.  According to a 1979 historic site evaluation of the house, the stonework in its original construction is "fabulous".

The house was listed on the National Register of Historic Places in 1983.

References

Houses on the National Register of Historic Places in Utah
Houses completed in 1882
Houses in Beaver County, Utah
National Register of Historic Places in Beaver County, Utah